See you, See me is an Educational programme set in Scotland. It aired on BBC2 for several series between 1993 and 2005. The equivalent programme broadcast from London was Zig Zag, as both series focused on the 7 – 9 age group.  Some early episodes were 15 minutes in length, while most programmes were 20 minutes. Grant Stott and Wilma Kennedy were the presenters from the beginning until the 2000s. Three series involved exploring Scottish Physical Features which saw the arrival of Goggs the Alien and Tess McCalli. Tess had a call from an American man called Mr Penneny who lived in New York City. Mr Penneny wanted to find out about the Central Lowlands
where See you, See me is filmed. Series 4 was Aired in 2005 and starred Katrina Bryan and Gavin Mitchell. The latest series was presented by James MacKenzie who explored the geography and the history of Scotland.

Episodes 

First broadcast in 1994 episodes:
Romans in Scotland (15 minute episodes) (repeated in 2000)
Programme 1 Frontier people	 	 	 
Programme 2 Home	 	 	 
Programme 3 Food	 	 	 
Programme 4 Health	 	 	 
Programme 5 Trade

First broadcast in Autumn  1995 episodes:
1960's
Programme 1 Entertainment	 	 	 
Programme 2 Home life	 	 	 
Programme 3 School life	 	 	 
Programme 4 Shops and money	 	 	 
Programme 5 Transport

First broadcast in 1997 episodes:
Health
1. Food Is Fun
2. Food Is Fuel
3. Feeling Fine
4. Breathe Easy
5. Being Different

Maps
1. Landscape
2. Symbols
3. Farm And Croft
4. Towns
5. Transport

Scotland (broadcast Spring 1997)
1. Hill
2. Glen
3. River
4. Moor
5. Sea Loch

Weather
1. Weather: Rain And Snow
2. Weather: Sun And Wind
3. Weather Music
4. Weather: Art
5. Weather: Movement

First broadcast in 1998 episodes:
Vikings
1. Sea (12,13 January 1998)
2. Invaders (19, 20 January 1998)
3. Home And Settlements (26, 27 January 1998)
4. Women And Girls (2, 3 February 1998)
5. Trade And Crafts (9, 10, 16, 17 February 1998)

Design 
1. Designing Your Clothes (23, 24 February)
2. Designing Your Place (2, 3 March)
3. Designing Your Environment (9, 10 March) 
4. Designing To Tell (16, 17 March)
5. Designing To Entertain (23, 24 March)

Networks
1. Getting Around Town
2. Getting Out of Town
3. Goods on the Move 1
4. Goods on the Move 2
5. Eurolinks

Castles
1. Building A Castle
2. Living in a Castle
3. Castle Under Siege
4. Castle Banquet
5. Castle at Leisure

First broadcast in 1999 episodes:
Money
1. What Is Money?
2. What Is A Bank?
3. Money at Work

Where We Live
1. Falkirk And Stromness 1
2. Falkirk And Stromness 2

First broadcast in 2000 episodes:
Farming 
1. On The Farm
2. Farmer's Year

Space
1. Solar System
2. Sun And Moon
3. Space Quest

Scotland's Inventors
1. Communication – John Logie Baird
2. Transport – James Watt
3. Medicine – Alexander Fleming

Cycle into Europe
1. Good Cycling
2. In The Town
3. In The Country

Buildings of Faith
1. Christian Church
2. Jewish Synagogue
3. Moslem Mosque
4. Sikh Gurdwara

Autumn 2001
1 Money 
Programme 1. What Is Money?
Programme 2. What Is A Bank?
Programme 3. Money at Work
2 Picts and Scots 
Programme 1 The Picts 
Programme 2 The Scotti 
Programme 3 The New Scots 
3 Transport Networks
Programme 1 Getting around town
Programme 2 Getting out of town 
Programme 3 Goods on the move I – rail and sea links 
Programme 4 Goods on the move II – road links 
Programme 5 Euro links 

Spring 2002
1 The Vikings
Programme 1 The sea 
Programme 2 Invaders 
Programme 3 Homes 
Programme 4 Women and girls 
Programme 5 Trade and crafts 

Autumn 2002
1 Scotland's Inventors
2 Weather – People and Place

Spring 2003
1 Are you eco-friendly?
Programme 1 The seashore
Programme 2 The river 
Programme 3 The town 
Programme 4 The forest 
Programme 5 The mountain 
2 Castles
Programme 1 Building a castle 
Programme 2 Living in a castle
Programme 3 Castle under siege 
Programme 4 A castle banquet
Programme 5 A castle at leisure

Autumn 2003
1 Buildings of Faith
Programme 1. Christian Church
Programme 2. Jewish Synagogue
Programme 3. Moslem Mosque
Programme 4. Sikh Gurdwara
2 Cycle into Europe
Programme One Safe cycling
Programme Two in town
Programme Three The countryside

Autumn 2004
1 Scotland's Inventors 
Programme 1 Communication
Programme 2 Transport
Programme 3 Medicine
2 Skara Brae 
Programme 1 The evidence
Programme 2 The discovery
4 Farming 
5 Space
Programme 1. Solar System
Programme 2. Sun And Moon
Programme 3. Space Quest

Spring 2005
1 Scottish physical features part 2 – The Central Lowlands
Programme 1 Powerful Places
Programme 2 Restless Rivers
Programme 3 Volcanic Scotland
2 Weather – People and place
Programme 1. Rain and Snow	 17 January: 1030–1050
Programme 2. Sun and Wind	 17 January: 1050–1110

Autumn 2005
1 Citizenship: making decisions
Programme 1 at home with decisions
Programme 2 Out and about with T.O.P.S.
2 Are you eco-friendly?
Programme 1 The seashore
Programme 2 The river 
Programme 3 The town 
Programme 4 The forest 
Programme 5 The mountain 
3 Money
Programme 1 What is money? 
Programme 2 What is a bank? 
Programme 3 Making and spending money 

Spring 2006
1 Scottish physical features part 3 – The Southern Uplands
2 Risk
Programme 1 Living dangerously
Programme 2 Stick to your guns

Autumn 2006
1 Castles
Programme 1 Building a castle 
Programme 2 Living in a castle
Programme 3 Castle under siege 
Programme 4 A castle banquet
Programme 5 A castle at leisure
2 The Highlands and Islands
Programme 6 The Grampian Tour
Programme 7 The Northern Tour
Programme 8 The Island Tour
3 Farming
Programme 9 on the farm
Programme 10 The farmer's year

Spring 2007
Vikings in Scotland
Programme 1 The coming of the Norse 
Programme 2 The success of the Norse 
Programme 3 The legacy of the Norse
Financial capability – Treasure!
Programme 4 The bounty and the budget 
Programme 5 Debts and doubloons

Autumn 2007
Buildings of Faith
Programme 1 The Jewish Synagogue (15 October)
Programme 2 The Sikh Gurdwara 
Programme 3 The Christian Church (12 November)
Programme 4 The Islamic Mosque (19 November)

Spring 2008
1 Skara Brae
Programme 1 The evidence (10 January)
Programme 2 The discovery (17 January) 
2 Birds
Programme 1 Urban birds (24 January)
Programme 2 Rural birds (31 January)
Programme 3 Coastal birds (7 February)
3 Central lowlands
Programme 1 Powerful Places (28 February)
Programme 2 Restless Rivers (6 March)
Programme 3 Volcanic Scotland (13 March)
4 Cycle into Europe
Cycle into Europe
Programme One Safe cycling (29 February)
Programme Two in town (7 March)
Programme Three The countryside (14 March)

Autumn 2008

Financial Capability
Mondays 11:40
3 November 2008 The Bounty and the Budget
10 November 2008 Debts and Doubloons

The Romans
Fridays 11:40
7 November 2008 Programme 1
14 November 2008 Programme 2

Vikings in Scotland
Fridays 11:40
21 November 2008 The Coming of the Norse
28 November 2008 The Success of the Norse
5 December 2008 The Legacy of the Norse
 BBC Scotland Education Teacher Notes 2001 – 2008

Series One 1993
Historic Scotland 1 – 4 September 1993
Historic Scotland 2 – 11 September 1993
Historic Scotland 3 – 18 September 1993

Series Two 1999
Finding out 1 – 1 January 1999
Finding out 2 – 8 January 1999
Finding out 3 – 15 January 1999

Series Three 2004
Decisions 1 – 22 March 2004
Decisions 2 – 29 March 2004
Decisions 3 – 5 April 2004

Series Four 2005
Powerful places  – 7 January 2005
Restless Rivers  – 14 January 2005
Volcanic Scotland  – 21 January 2005

Series Five 2007  –
The Vikings of Scotland  – 30 March 2007
The history of Loch-ness  – 20 April 2007
Roman Scotland  – 27 April 2007
Celtic Scotland  – 4 May 2007
Scottish cooking  – 11 May 2007
Scottish Castles  – 18 May 2007

Unknown Tx date:
HEALTH AND SAFE LIVING
Look out for yourself
Making friends
In touch ok/not ok

BBC Television shows
Scottish television shows